YWN or ywn may refer to:

 Yeshiva World News, an Orthodox Jewish online news publication
 ywn, the ISO 639-3 code for Yawanawá language, western Amazonia